Sean Hurwitz is an American musician known as the guitarist of Smash Mouth (2011–2012, 2012–2016, 2019–present) and Enrique Iglesias. Hurwitz is also a producer, singer, and songwriter based in Los Angeles, United States.

Early life 

Born in 1979 in Israel to American Parents Ira and (Dr.) Judy Lieman-Hurwitz. Sean found his love for music at a very young age, through his exposure to Israeli artists such as Gidi Gov and Mashina and British artists such as Eric Clapton and Pink Floyd. Hurwitz had his first experience playing a musical instrument at age 7, when he started taking piano lessons.  It was his introduction to the movie "Back to the Future" that ignited his desire for a totally different instrument. After watching Marty McFly (Michael J. Fox) rock out on a Gibson ES-345 electric guitar to "Johnny Be Good" (Chuck Berry), Hurwitz knew that he was meant to pick up his own guitar and perform live in venues all over the world.

His parents bought him his first guitar not long after Hurwitz expressed his desire to play, and his father taught him his first few chords. Over the ensuing years, Hurwitz continued to teach himself guitar, while also being given the opportunity to learn about producing successful live shows. Years later, by age 21, he would become a very popular audio engineer and stage tech in Israel. While working closely with all the great Israeli artists at that time, Hurwitz never forgot his original dream, which was to play and perform music for a living.  At age 23, after a terrorist attack in Israel affected him very personally, he decided that he couldn't afford to waste any more time and moved to LA to follow that dream.

Los Angeles career 

Hurwitz paid his dues and worked his way up the LA music scene while playing with many unsigned solo artists & bands. It was during this time that Sean would meet his good friend and drummer Randy Cooke, who would eventually help him get his first signed artist gig with Singer Songwriter Anna Nalick. Hurwitz then joined Nalick on the road while she promoted her second Studio Album "Shine". Over the years, Sean has also had the pleasure of sharing both stage and studio with many artists including Enrique Iglesias, Smash Mouth, Gin Blossoms, Chris Wallace, and many more. In addition to being a live musician, Hurwitz has also written, produced & recorded hundreds of songs (since 2007) that are licensed to TV, Film and Radio worldwide.

Equipment 

Hurwitz uses and endorses the following companies:    
 Bogner
 Digitech
 DR Strings
 Eastman Guitars
 LsL Instruments
 MESA/Boogie
 Reunion Blues
 Shabat Guitars

References

External links 
 

Living people
Israeli Jews
Israeli people of American-Jewish descent
Israeli rock guitarists
American people of Israeli descent
Jewish American musicians
Year of birth missing (living people)
21st-century American Jews